František Čermák and Filip Polášek were the defending champions, but they decided  to participate instead at the 2012 BMW Open.
Jonathan Erlich and Andy Ram won the title defeating Martin Emmrich and Andreas Siljeström 4–6, 6–2, [10–6] in the final.

Seeds

Draw

Draw

References
 Main Draw

Serbia Open
Serbia Open - Doubles